Strelka (rus. Стрелка) is a computer chess engine for Windows, developed by Yuri Osipov. In total five versions of the program have been developed. The current version, 5.5, runs only on a single processor core. Strelka was one of the strongest programs in the world, according to several blitz rating lists and the strongest in Russia at the time.

Playing strength 
As of version 5.0, Strelka includes 32-bit and 64-bit uniprocessor versions. In rating CCRL 40/40 from 17.08.2013 chess program Strelka 5.5 64-bit has 3115 Bayeselo. In blitz-rating CCRL 4/40 from 24.08.2013 chess program Strelka 5.1 64-bit has 3137 Bayeselo. In blitz-rating CEGT 4/40 from 28.08.2013 chess program Strelka 5.0 x64 1CPU has 3003 Elo.

Rybka controversy 
In May 2007, a new chess engine called Strelka (Russian for "arrow") appeared on the scene, claimed to be written by Yuri Osipov (born in 1962). Soon, there were allegations that Strelka was a clone of Rybka 1.0 beta, in the sense that it was a reverse-engineered and slightly modified version of Rybka. Several players found Strelka to yield identical analysis to Rybka in a variety of different situations, even having the same bugs and weaknesses in some cases. Osipov, however, stated repeatedly on discussion boards that Strelka was based on Fruit, not Rybka, and that any similarities was either because Rybka also was based on Fruit, or because he had tuned the evaluation function to be as close to Rybka as possible.

With the release of Strelka 2.0 beta, source code was included. Rajlich stated that the source made it "obvious" that Strelka 2.0 beta was indeed a Rybka 1.0 beta clone, although not without some improvements in certain areas. On the basis of this, he claimed the source as his own and intended to re-release it under his own name, although he later decided not to do so. He also made allegations that "Yuri Osipov" was a pen name.

According to Victor Zakharov (Convekta company) in his review for Arena chess website: "I consider that Yuri Osipov (Ivanovich) is his real name. He didn't hide it. However I can't state this with 100% assurance."
And he also has some contact with Yuri Osipov for development of mobile platforms chess program.

However, Fruit author Fabien Letouzey has clearly expressed in the open letter mentioned above that Strelka 2.0 beta is a Fruit derivate with some minor changes.

References

External links 
  Chess engine Strelka
  Strelka by Yuri Osipov, Russia
 By Jury Osipov (English Translated).

Downloads 
 Strelka 5.5
 Strelka 5.1
 Strelka 5 Jim Ablett's compilation
 Strelka 5
 Strelka 3R
 Strelka 2.0 B
 Strelka 1.8 UCI
 Strelka 1.0b

Chess engines